Bathymunida ocularis is a species of squat lobster in the family Munididae. The specific epithet is derived from the Latin ocularis, meaning "of the eyes", in reference to the granulated eyestalks that are unique to the species.

References

Squat lobsters
Crustaceans described in 1996